The Goldene Leinwand (Golden Screen) is an award created in 1964 by the HDF ("Hauptverband Deutscher Filmtheater e.V.", literally translated "Federal Association For Movie Theatres") and the journal Filmecho/Filmwoche.

Like a Golden Record, it is a sales certification.

The Goldene Leinwand is to be bestowed upon film distributors for having provided a film of feature-length which sold more than 3,000,000 tickets within 18 months.

Categories 
Goldene Leinwand (“Golden Screen”) for 3 million tickets within 18 months
Goldene Leinwand mit Stern (“Golden Screen with Star”) for 6 million tickets within 18 months
Goldene Leinwand mit 2 Sternen (“Golden Screen with Two Stars”) for 9 million tickets within 18 months
Goldene Leinwand mit 3 Sternen (“Golden Screen with Three Stars”) for 12 million tickets within 18 months
Goldene Leinwand Sonderausgaben (“Golden Screen Special Editions”) for 15 or 18 million tickets within 18 months
Goldene Leinwand mit Stern und Brillanten (“Golden Screen with Star and Diamond”) for a series of 6 coherent films that altogether sold more than 30 million tickets
Goldene Leinwand für besondere Verdienste (“Honorary Golden Screen”)
Goldene Leinwand Pin (“Honorary Golden Screen As Pin”)

Titanic (1997) is the only film that was awarded special editions for 15 and 18 million tickets.

The James Bond films (1983), Star Wars (2005) and the Harry Potter film series (2009) were awarded a "Goldene Leinwand mit Stern und Brillianten".

Awards

Goldene Leinwand mit Stern

Goldene Leinwand mit Stern (Sonderversion)

Goldene Leinwand mit 2 Sternen

See also
List of highest-grossing films in Germany

References

External links 
 Homepage HDF
 Homepage Filmecho

German film awards